Anticancer Research is an independent international peer-reviewed medical journal published by the International Institute of Anticancer Research, addressing experimental and clinical topics in oncology.
Issues are released monthly print and online (by Highwire Press), and an annual Index is also published. Anticancer Research was established in 1981 by John G. Delinassios.

According to the Journal Citation Reports, the journal had a 2020 impact factor of 2.480 and 25,656 total cites. The 2020 rejection rate was 68%.

According to Scimago, the journal belongs to the second quartile (Q2) in the "Medicine" category.

Abstracting and indexing 
Articles in Anticancer Research are abstracted and/or indexed by:

 BIOBASE
Biological Abstracts
 CAM abstracts
 Cambridge Scientific Abstracts
Current Contents (Life Sciences)
 EMBASE
 EMBiology
GEOBASE
 Pubmed/Medline
 Science Citation Index
 Scopus
Web of Science

External links 
 
 International Institute of Anticancer Research

Oncology journals
Publications established in 1981
English-language journals
Monthly journals